Ertuğ Ergin (May 18, 1970 in Adapazarı – December 14, 2012 in Adapazarı) was a Turkish alternative pop-rock singer-songwriter.

Discography
 2005 : Hayatım (İstanbul Plak)
 2008 : A1 (Mess Production)

References

Turkish male singers
1970 births
2012 deaths
Deaths from cancer in Turkey